Veerapandi is a revenue village in the Mugaiyur block and Kandachipuram taluk of Viluppuram district in the Indian state of Tamil Nadu.

Geography
Veerapandi is within Kandachipuram taluk, which is in the southwestern part of Viluppuram district. The village is within the drainage basin of the Thenpennai River.

Demographics
In 2011 Veerapandi had a population of 7,690 people living in 1,588 households. 3,789 (49.3%) of the inhabitants were male, while 3,901 (50.7%) were female. 1,059 children in the town, about 13.8% of the population, were at or below the age of 6. 53.5% of the population was literate, with the male rate of 62.7% being notably higher than the female rate of 44.6%. Scheduled Castes and Scheduled Tribes accounted for 21.5% and 0.026% of the population, respectively.

References

Cities and towns in Viluppuram district